William Oates may refer to:
William C. Oates (1835–1910), Confederate colonel during the American Civil War
William Oates (Irish cricketer) (1852–1940), Irish first-class cricketer
William Oates (cricketer, born 1862) (1862–1942), English cricketer
William Oates (cricketer, born 1929) (1929–2001), English first-class cricketer
William Wilfred Oates of Burns & Oates, British publishing house

See also
William Oats (1841–1911), Australian mining captain and politician